The England women's national rugby union team have played 38 matches at the Women's Rugby World Cup tournaments from 1991 to 2017. They have won two tournaments in 1994 and 2014. They were runners-up in 1991, 2002, 2006, 2010 and 2017. They have been in every final at the tournament except for 1998 where they placed third.

England hosted the 2010 Women's Rugby World Cup.

By position

1991 Rugby World Cup

Knockout stage

1994 Rugby World Cup

Knockout stage

1998 Rugby World Cup

Knockout stage

2002 Rugby World Cup

Knockout stage

2006 Rugby World Cup 

Pool B ⇔ Pool C

Knockout stage

2010 Rugby World Cup

Knockout stage

2014 Rugby World Cup

Knockout stage

2017 Rugby World Cup

Knockout stage

Overall record 
Overall record against all nations in the World Cup:

References

External links 

 Official site of the Rugby World Cup.
 Official site of World Rugby.

 
World Cup